This article is a catalog of actresses and models who have appeared on the cover of Harper's Bazaar Ukraine, the Ukrainian edition of Harper's Bazaar magazine, starting with the magazine's first issue in January 2009.

2009

2010

2011

2012

2013

2014

2015

2016

2017

2018

2019

2020

External links
 Harper's Bazaar Ukraine
 Harper's Bazaar Ukraine on Models.com

Ukraine